Nathaniel Paterson (1787–25 April 1871) was a Scottish minister who served as Moderator of the General Assembly to the Free Church of Scotland in 1850/51. He was a close friend of Walter Scott and was included in his circle of "worthies".

Life

He was born in Kells in Kirkcudbrightshire in 1787, the eldest son of Mary Locke and her husband, Walter Paterson a stone engraver, and grandson of Robert Paterson aka "Old Mortality".

Nathaniel was educated at Balmaclellan. In 1804 he went to the University of Edinburgh to study divinity. Not until 1816 was he licensed by the Church of Scotland, initially being employed as an assistant at Linlithgow. He took some time to find a patron and only in 1821 became minister of Galashiels. In 1833 he moved to St Andrews Church in Glasgow. This church stood on Greendyke Street near Glasgow Green.

In the Disruption of 1843 he left the established Church of Scotland and, together with a large part of his original congregation, created the Free St Andrews Church. They worshipped in a rear hall in the Black Bull Inn while the new church was built. The new church stood on the corner of Hanover Street and Cathedral Street.

In 1850 he replaced Very Rev Mackintosh MacKay as Moderator of the Free Church. He in turn was succeeded in 1851 by Very Rev Alexander Duff.

He lived at 19 Landsdowne Crescent in Glasgow.

He retired to Helensburgh around 1864 and died there on 25 April 1871. He is buried in Glasgow Southern Necropolis on Caledonia Road in Glasgow.

The Free St Andrews Church was demolished in the 20th century.

Publications

The Manse Garden (1836)
The Cry of the Perishing (1842)
Popery: The Enemy of the Souls of Man
Popery Accommodated to Human Corruption

Artistic recognition

He was photographed by Hill & Adamson in 1850. He was photographed in 1860 at the foot of the steps to New College with several other ex-Moderators of the Free Church. A coloured version of this photograph has been produced.

Family

In February 1825 he married Margaret Laidlaw (1800-1864), daughter of Robert Laidlaw.

His brother, Walter Paterson (1790-1849) was minister of Kirkurd.

References
Citations

Sources

 

1787 births
1871 deaths
People from Dumfries and Galloway
19th-century Ministers of the Church of Scotland
19th-century Ministers of the Free Church of Scotland